The Bribe: variations and extensions on Spillane is an album by American composer and saxophonist/multi-instrumentalist John Zorn, consisting of music created for three half-hour radio plays produced by Mabou Mines theater company in 1986. It utilizes compositional techniques, source material, and personnel that are similar to Zorn's Spillane.

The album shares its title with The Bribe, a 1949 American film noir directed by Robert Z. Leonard.

Reception

The Allmusic review by Joslyn Layne awarded the album 4 stars stating "A nicer mood pervades this release, yet given its kaleidoscopic and slightly demented tone, it certainly can't be described as relaxed. Then again, maybe "relaxed" isn't too far off, after all—perhaps by playing a supporting role to the production's cast instead of driving the concept, the musicians were able to enjoy themselves a little more.".

Track listing 
 Part 1: Sliding On The Ice
 "Gill's Theme" - 2:07
 "Hydrant Of The Vogue" - 0:41
 "The Big Freeze" - 1:01
 "Meters" - 2:24
 "The Bridge/Cocktails" - 4:06
 "The Willies" - 1:01
 "The Taxman Cometh" - 1:16
 "Night Walk" - 1:09
 "Skit Rhesus" - 2:43
 "The Boxer" - 0:59
 "Trick Or Treat" - 3:22
 "The Latin Trip/Gill's Theme" - 3:30
 Part 2: The Arrest  
 "A Taste Of Voodoo" - 3:20
 "Inhaling The Image" - 1:49
 "City Chase" - 3:27
 "Dreams Of The Red Chamber" - 11:38
 "Rash Acts" - 1:30
 "Chippewa" - 1:24
 "The Hour Of Thirteen" - 0:47
 "Radio Mouth/Gill's Theme" - 2:57
 Part 3: The Art Bar
 "Midnight Streets" - 3:58
 "Victoria Lake" - 3:12
 "Strip Central" - 5:26
 "Pink Limousine" - 9:18
 "Skyline" - 3:19
 "Ordinary Lies/Gill's Theme" - 2:04
All compositions by John Zorn
 Recorded at Radio City Studio, New York City in 1986.

Personnel 
John Zorn - alto saxophone
 Anthony Coleman - piano 
 Marty Ehrlich - reeds 
 Carol Emanuel - harp 
 David Hofstra - double bass 
 Wayne Horvitz - organ 
 Christian Marclay - turntables 
 Ikue Mori - drum machines 
 Zeena Parkins - harp
 Bobby Previte - percussion 
 Robert Quine - guitar 
 Reck - rhythm guitar 
 Jim Staley - trombone

References 

1998 albums
Albums produced by John Zorn
John Zorn albums
Tzadik Records albums